Giovanni Battista Soriani, O. Carm. (died 25 June 1582) was a Roman Catholic prelate who served as Bishop of Bisceglie (1576–1582).

Biography
Giovanni Battista Soriani was ordained a priest in the Order of the Brothers of Our Lady of Mount Carmel.
On 22 August 1576, he was appointed during the papacy of Pope Gregory XIII as Bishop of Bisceglie. 
On 2 September 1576, he was consecrated bishop by Giulio Antonio Santorio, Cardinal-Priest of San Bartolomeo all'Isola, with Gaspare Viviani, Bishop of Hierapetra et Sitia, and Giovanni Antonio Facchinetti de Nuce, Bishop Emeritus of Nicastro, serving as co-consecrators. 
He served as Bishop of Bisceglie until his death on 25 June 1582 in Barletta, Italy.

While bishop, he was the principal co-consecrator of Paolo Bellardito, Bishop of Lipari (1580).

References

External links and additional sources
 (for Chronology of Bishops) 
 (for Chronology of Bishops) 

16th-century Italian Roman Catholic bishops
Bishops appointed by Pope Gregory XIII
1582 deaths
Carmelite bishops